Buchanania cochinchinensis, commonly known as charoli nut, almondette, Cuddapah almond, calumpong, Hamilton mombin, is a deciduous tree of the cashew family. The charoli tree is native to the Indian subcontinent, South Central China, and much of Southeast Asia.

The charoli tree produces fruit that is edible to humans. The seeds are used as a cooking spice, especially in India. Charoli seeds are also used in the Ayurveda, Unani, and Siddha systems of medicine.

Description
Young branches are covered with dense, matted, woolly hairs. When ripe, they are stone hard and reddish-purple in color. Flowering occurs March–April, and the fruit is generally harvested in the months of April to June.

Taxonomy
Genus Buchanania is named for Francis Buchanan (1762–1829), a Scottish botanist, explorer, naturalist, and surgeon in the British East India Company. B. cochinchinensis is one of 25 currently accepted species in genus Buchanania. The species was first described as Toluifera cochinchinensis in 1790 by João de Loureiro, a Portuguese Jesuit missionary and botanist. Initially placed in genus Toluifera, the species was later included in multiple other genera, including Glycosmis, Lanzana, Loureira, Lundia, Mangifera, and Spondias. The species was most recently reclassified as Buchanania cochinchinensis in 1996.

Distribution and habitat
The charoli tree is native to Bangladesh, Cambodia, China (south-central and Hainan), India, Laos, Myanmar, Nepal, Thailand, Vietnam, and the Western Himalayas. It grows primarily in the wet tropical and tropical rainforest biomes.

Uses

Food and cooking
Though sometimes referred to as the "chironji nut" or "charoli nut", the fruit is actually a type of drupe rather than a true botanical nut. After the hard shell of the drupe is cracked, the stubby seed within is similar in texture to a pine nut. The seeds are used as a cooking spice, especially in Indian cuisine. Though they can be eaten raw, they are often toasted or roasted before use, as this intensifies the flavor of any nut or seed. They are commonly used in sweets in India, or ground into powders for thickening and flavoring savory sauces, batters and kormas.

Traditional medicine
Charoli seeds are used in the Ayurveda, Unani, and Siddha systems of medicine. A decoction can be prepared from the bark of the stem or the leaves, to be used as a treatment for indigestion, mumps, impotence, spermatorrhea, heavy menstrual bleeding, diarrhea, or snakebite. This can also be used as an expectorant, aphrodisiac, or a laxative. The leaves can be crushed and applied to burns and wounds.

Cultivation
Leafhoppers, mealybugs, and bark-eating caterpillars (Indarbela spp.) are important pests of B. cochinchinensis, while gummosis and powdery mildew represent important pathogens.

Significance in Buddhism

Circa 588 BCE, the 35-year-old Siddhartha Gautama stayed for seven weeks (7x7 days = 49 days = 1 sattasattāha) at Bodh Gaya, which is located in the present-day Indian state of Bihar. According to the Great Chronicle of Buddhas, he spent one week at each of seven successive locations there. During these seven weeks, he did not eat or drink, wash or excrete, or lie down. The specific locations were:
Week 1: the Week on the Aparājita Throne (Pallanka Sattāha). After meditating under the Bodhi Tree for seven days and nights, he attained enlightenment, becoming the spiritual teacher known as the Buddha and the founder of Buddhism.
Week 2: the Week of the Gaze (Animisa Sattāha)
Week 3: the Week on the Walk (Cankama Sattāha)
Week 4: the Week at the Golden House (Ratanāghara Sattāha)
Week 5: the Week at the Ajapāla Banyan Tree
Week 6: the Week at Mucalinda Lake (Mucalinda Sattāha)
Week 7: the Week at the Rājāyatana Tree (Rājāyatana Sattāha)

The seventh week was passed while sitting under a rājāyatana (B. cochinchinensis) tree, where the Buddha enjoyed the bliss of his newly attained buddhahood. Upon the completion of this sattasattāha, several important "firsts" in Buddhism took place at the rājāyatana tree at Bodh Gaya, including:
the first words of dharma to be uttered by the Buddha
the first lay disciples (two passing merchants from Ukkalājanapada named Tapussa and Bhallika) to take refuge in the teachings of the Buddha
the first food offering to the Buddha (rice cake and honey) after his enlightenment
the first Buddhist monk's bowl
the first relics of the Buddha to be distributed after his attainment of buddhahood

Tapussa and Bhallika (the two passing merchants who became the Buddha's first lay disciples) later returned to their home in Okkalapa (Lower Burma), where they built a cetiya on Singuttara Hill (the Shwedagon Pagoda), where they enshrined the hair relics given to them by the Buddha.

Gallery

See also
List of culinary herbs and spices
List of Indian spices

References

Bibliography

cochinchinensis
Flora of Hainan
Flora of the Indian subcontinent
Flora of Indo-China
Flora of South-Central China
Indian spices
Plants described in 1790
Trees in Buddhism